The George Washington Classic was a golf tournament on the LPGA Tour from 1970 to 1975. It was played at the Hidden Spring Golf Club in Horsham, Pennsylvania.

Winners
George Washington Ladies Classic
1975 Carol Mann

George Washington Classic
1974 Sandra Haynie
1973 Carole Jo Skala
1972 Kathy Ahern
1971 Jane Blalock

George Washington Golf Classic
1970 Judy Rankin

References

Former LPGA Tour events
Golf in Pennsylvania
Recurring sporting events established in 1970
Recurring events disestablished in 1975
1970 establishments in Pennsylvania
1975 disestablishments in Pennsylvania
History of women in Pennsylvania